Henry Aglionby Aglionby (1790 – 31 July 1854) was a British barrister and Whig politician.

Life and career

Born Henry Aglionby Bateman, he was the son of Rev. Samuel Bateman and Anne Aglionby. Anne became one of the co-heirs of the Aglionby family when her brother Christopher died without issue in 1785; Henry adopted the name of Aglionby in 1798 by the will of his aunt Julia Aglionby. Aglionby was educated at St John's College, Cambridge, where he graduated with a BA in 1813 and a MA in 1816. Called to the bar at Lincoln's Inn in June 1816, he became a special pleader on the Northern Circuit.

He was elected at the 1832 general election for the borough of Cockermouth in Cumberland, and held the seat until his death in 1854,
aged 64.
Like many others in western Cumberland, he was a strong supporter of the secret ballot, prompted part by the systematic bribery and intimidation which was used in 1832 to secure the election of the Tory MP Matthias Attwood in Whitehaven.
In April 1833 Aglionby voted in favour of a motion proposed by City of London MP George Grote
"That all elections of Members to serve in Parliament should in future be by ballot". The motion was defeated by 211 votes to 106.

Personal life

In 1840, he inherited the rest of the Aglionby estates, including Nunnery, Cumberland, upon the death of his first cousin Francis Aglionby (formerly Yates). He married a Mrs. Sadd on 2 March 1852, at his manor of Caterham, Surrey; they had no children. By entail, the Aglionby estates passed to Charles Yates, of Virginia, the nephew of Francis Aglionby.

References

External links 
 

1790 births
1854 deaths
Whig (British political party) MPs for English constituencies
Members of the Parliament of the United Kingdom for English constituencies
UK MPs 1832–1835
UK MPs 1835–1837
UK MPs 1837–1841
UK MPs 1841–1847
UK MPs 1847–1852
UK MPs 1852–1857
Cumbria MPs
Alumni of St John's College, Cambridge
Members of Lincoln's Inn